The Fourth Dynasty of ancient Egypt (notated Dynasty IV) is characterized as a "golden age" of the Old Kingdom of Egypt. It was a time of peace and prosperity as well as one during which trade with other countries is documented.

The Fourth Dynasty heralded the height of the pyramid-building age. The relative peace of the Third Dynasty allowed the Dynasty IV rulers the leisure to explore more artistic and cultural pursuits. King Sneferu's building experiments led to the evolution from the mastaba-styled step pyramids to the smooth sided “true” pyramids, such as those on the Giza Plateau. No other period in Egypt's history equaled Dynasty IV's architectural accomplishments. Each of the rulers of this dynasty (except for Shepseskaf, the last) commissioned at least one pyramid to serve as a tomb or cenotaph.

The Fourth Dynasty was the second of four dynasties that made up the "Old Kingdom". King Sneferu, the first king of the Fourth Dynasty, held territory from ancient Libya in the west to the Sinai Peninsula in the east, to Nubia in the south. It was a successful period and this era is known for its advancement and concentrated government, as seen in the organized building of pyramids and other monuments.

Knowledge of the Old Kingdom comes mainly from these structures and objects discovered in the desert cemeteries of Giza.

Rulers

Summary

Sneferu 
Sneferu, lauded as "Bringer of Beauty", "Master of All Justice", and "Ruler of Lower and Upper Nile", was the first pharaoh of the fourth dynasty. He descended from a family in Middle Egypt that lived near Hermopolis, and most likely ascended to the throne by marrying a royal heiress. There is still debate as to who his father was, with the credit often being given to Huni, but this cannot be confirmed due to the break in dynasties. His mother, Meresankh I was either a lesser wife or concubine of Huni.

Egypt in the Third Millennium BC was, by all accounts, a land of peace and plenty. Elites commonly ate fattened ducks and geese, and they wore fine white linens.

Until his reign, Egyptian kings were thought to be worldly incarnations of Horus, obtaining total deification exclusively in death. Sneferu was the first king to proclaim that he was the embodiment of Ra, another sun deity. Khufu would pursue his father's path, taking the name Son of the Sun God.

On the whole, Egypt was ruled by two centers of power—legal authority and traditional authority. Legal authority constituted governing by the king, not over the people directly, but via viziers and nomarchs. Traditional authority was derived from the concept that the deities gave a king the divine right to rule as he pleased. At its heart, the Fourth Dynasty Egyptian government became organized so that only the king could direct traditional authority.

The Bent Pyramid was Sneferu's first attempt at building a perfect structure, but it slopes and eventually bends to a lower angle, giving the structure a squished look. His Red Pyramid is widely considered the first true pyramid and earned its name from the reddish tint in the limestone used. The Red Pyramid was considered the first pyramid, approximately 150 years after the structures built by King Djoser. The Red Pyramid was the first to be given a solid foundation so that it was stable enough for a taller building. He is also said to be responsible for a series of pyramids built in Seila. He commissioned a total of three pyramids, but there are records that point to a fourth. Although he did not construct any of the pyramids at Giza, he is known as the king who moved the most stone and brick. A lot of Sneferu's political expeditions were to other countries to secure two things: a substantial labor force and access to a large store of materials. He traveled to Nubia and Libya for these things. His incursions in these areas allowed Sneferu to secure a large labor force, so large, in fact, that it caused huge devastation to the raided countries. He also needed cattle and other food sources to provide to the people building his pyramids. By the end of his military efforts, he managed to capture 11,000 prisoners and 13,100 head of cattle.

Khufu 

Khufu, known to the Greek as Cheops, and Sneferu's successor—though it is unclear whether he was the biological son of Sneferu—was a widely known king. He is still known very well in present-day media, being featured in movies, novels, and television shows. His fame stems from his pyramid on the northeastern plateau at Giza, where he was buried. His mortuary temple was built on the northern end of the pyramid, which is no longer accessible due to ravages by grave robbers. Only three-dimensional reliefs have been recovered and have lasted into modern day, including many limestone busts and clay figurines. Khufu's activities in and out of Egypt are not well documented (except his architecture work) and was highly romanticized by the Ancient Greeks. These Greeks felt that Khufu was a wicked man who offended the deities and forced his subjects into slavery. Khufu, as the son of Sneferu, was believed to be illegitimate and therefore unworthy of the throne. Even if he was Sneferu's true son, he did very little to expand the country of Egypt and failed to follow his father's footsteps. There are only a few records that stated he was involved in any political activities. The best guess historians can make is that there is evidence of construction of a harbor on the coast of the Red Sea that was excavated by John Gardner Wilkinson and James Burton in 1823.

Djedefre 

Djedefre is credited by historians with a reign of eight years. Not much is known of Djedefre, including his inconclusive lineage. It is possible that he is Khufu's son or that he was Khufu's brother. It is widely suggested that he is the son of a lesser queen who murdered the rightful heir to the throne and Djedefre's half brother, the crown prince Kawab. Djedefre chose to build his pyramid several kilometers north of Giza, creating speculation that there was a family feud that caused Djedefre to want to be far away from Khufu's tomb. A more favorable conclusion was that Djedef chose to be buried closer to Iunu, the center of the cult of Ra. His pyramid also features a statue of his wife, Hetepheres II, in the form of a sphinx. She was a daughter of Khufu and had been the wife of Kawab. It is sometimes suggested that this was the first true sphinx, although there is debate about the sphinx at Giza that was credited to Khafre. She became the longest living royal member of the dynasty, living into the reign of Shepseskaf.

Khafre 
Khafre, son of Khufu, succeeded his supposed brother, Djedefre, after his short reign. He chose to build his pyramid close to his father, matching it in style and being almost as large. At the front of the pyramid causeway lies the Great Sphinx that is said to bear his features. There is still debate on whether his Sphinx was erected before Djedefre's. Khafre's sphinx was well-known and closer to his subjects, making it harder to determine which was built first due to biased record keeping.

Menkaure 
Like many kings in this dynasty, the length of Menkaure's reign is uncertain, being projected for more than 63 years but it can certainly be an exaggeration. Menkaure succeeded his father, King Khafre. His pyramid is the third and smallest of those at Giza pyramid complex and is known as Netjer-er-Menkaure, which translates into "Menkaure is Divine". There was a sarcophagus found within the pyramid, that is approximately eight feet in length and three feet in height, made of basalt. Like many of the previous pyramids, Menkaure's was not inscribed, the interior having no record keeping of any kind.

Shepseskaf 
Shepseskaf is generally accepted as the last king of the Fourth Dynasty, succeeding Menkaure. There is no conclusive evidence of who his mother is, though it is believed that he was the son of a minor queen. Who his wife was also is unknown. Shepseskaf broke the chain of pyramid building by the previous five kings. Instead of a triangular pyramid, he chose to construct a rectangular block, commonly known as the Mastabat al-Fir’aun ("Pharaoh's Bench"). In like fashion, however, little script was found inside his tomb and he was buried in very simple terms.

Other notable individuals

Baka 
The identification of Baka is unresolved. Several ancient lists of kings have survived. They do not agree, however, and none of them may be considered complete. The Turin King List has a lacuna between Khafre and Menkaure, where the author had listed a king who reigned between these two pharaohs. The name of the king and length of the reign are completely lost in the lacuna.
The Saqqara Tablet also notes a king between Khafre and Menkaure, but here too, the name is lost.
Some authorities have equated this king with Bikheris, on Manetho's list, who could correspond to the Egyptian name Baka or Bakare.

Khentkaus I 
Perhaps the most intriguing evidence of the fourth dynasty is the status of Khentkaus I, also known as Khentykawes. She was a daughter of Menkaure and her tomb was built along the Menkaure causeway. She may have ruled as king.

Her tomb is a large mastaba tomb, with another off-center mastaba placed above it. The second mastaba could not be centered over her primary mastaba because of the free, unsupported, space in the rooms below.

On a granite doorway leading into her tomb, Khentkaus I is given titles that may be read either as mother of two kings of upper and lower Egypt, as mother of the king of upper and lower Egypt and king of upper and lower Egypt, or, as one scholar reads it, king of upper and lower Egypt and mother of two kings of upper and lower Egypt.

Furthermore, her depiction on this doorway also gives her the full trappings of kingship, including the false beard of the king. This depiction and the title given have led some Egyptologists to suggest that she reigned as king near the end of the fourth dynasty.

Her tomb was finished in a characteristic niche style of architecture, however, the niches were later filled in with a smooth casing of limestone.

Age of the Pyramids 

The Age of the Pyramids refers to the fact that the Fourth Dynasty was the time when most of the well-known pyramids were built, which include those at Giza. King Sneferu was the first king to express an interest in funerary rites and tombs, which led him to the planning of the largest pyramid at Egypt. His first pyramids were called the Bent Pyramid and Red Pyramid. The "Age of the Pyramids" was not just about the building of large and easily recognizable structures, but also a change in funerary practices and rituals. This includes the burying of elites in large structures and the use of extensive mummification.

Religious changes 
The Fourth Dynasty is where we truly see a shift in religious practices where worship of the Sun was commonplace. The Cult of Ra grew in size, going back to the fact that Djedef's tomb was built closer to the center of worship in what the Ancient Greeks called Heliopolis. It was a delta city near contemporary Cairo that had been occupied since the predynastic times, whose ancient Egyptian name was I͗wnw or Iunu and meant the pillars.

During the era when centralization of the nation's material, organic, and human resources began to develop, a relationship of the king to the deities became unchallenged and kings began carving their names into statues and monuments that previously had been reserved for deities. This speaks to a type of god complex on part of the kings. Khafre's famous statue, where a falcon was incorporated into his headgear, equated the king to the god Horus.

This fact, however, caused controversy. It was pitting Khafre's allegiance to Horus against the growing Cult of Ra, not far away in Helipolis. Kings no longer associated pyramids with the afterlife. The afterlife was once believed to be a divine kingdom that was represented as a type of idealistic heaven where only kings and pure hearts could go. Instead, the Fourth Dynasty represented a change in this idea, formulated the notion that the afterlife was a familiar place, taking the semblance of Earth. Religious rituals were notoriously conservative, from what historians know, and there is much to be desired from current known records.

Changing customs drove architectural changes 

The Old Kingdom saw a rise in the preservation of the deceased, making the preparation of bodies much more complex. The position of embalmer was created, and their jobs were solely to prepare a corpse in private. There were three ways to mummify a body: 1) Stucco: the body would be wrapped in fine linen and then covered in stucco plaster, the features of the body (including the face) were remodeled in the plaster; 2) Linen: the body would be wrapped in linen, which was sometimes treated with natron (a mixture of multiple sodium carbonates) and the linens would be treated with resin so that the features of the body could be modeled; and 3) Defleshing: removing all flesh and wrapping the bones in linens. Generally, organs were removed which were then put into jars that would accompany the body in the tomb, and the inside of the body flushed out.

Tombs in the Fourth Dynasty changed drastically. "Unimpressive" graves did not satisfy the elites, meaning they would settle for smaller structures if the interior was decorated. Hieroglyphic writings were important to elites because, one, it was a lavish display of wealth and, two, it guided their souls to the afterlife. The Fourth Dynasty, however, did not have these writings. Instead, the tomb was deeper and super-structures were larger. After the Giza pyramid complex, later generations of tombs were more reasonably sized. After the Middle Kingdom, royals abandoned pyramids; they preferred graves that were carved into living rock of the Upper Egyptian mountains.

Timeline 

Fourth Dynasty timeline

See also 
 Egyptian Fourth Dynasty Family Tree

References 

 
States and territories established in the 3rd millennium BC
States and territories disestablished in the 3rd millennium BC
04
3rd millennium BC in Egypt
3rd-millennium BC establishments in Egypt
3rd-millennium BC disestablishments in Egypt